This is an incomplete list of organisms that are true parasites upon other organisms.

Endoparasites
(endo = within; parasites that live inside their hosts)

Plants
 Rafflesia
 Cuscuta
 Mistletoe

Parasitic worms
These can be categorized into three groups; cestodes, nematodes and trematodes.  Examples include:
 Acanthocephala 
 Ascariasis (roundworms)
 Cestoda (tapeworms) including: Taenia saginata (human beef tapeworm), Taenia solium (human pork tapeworm), Diphyllobothrium latum (fish tapeworm) and Echinococcosis (hydatid tapeworm)
 Clonorchis sinensis (the Chinese liver fluke) 
 Dracunculus medinensis (Guinea worm)
 Enterobius vermicularis (pinworm)
 Filariasis
 Hookworm
 Loa loa
 Onchocerciasis (river blindness)
 Schistosomiasis
 Strongyloides stercoralis
 Tapeworm
 Toxocara canis (dog roundworm)
 Trichinella
 Whipworm

Protozoans
 Entamoeba histolytica and Entamoeba coli - can cause Amoebiasis
 Acanthamoeba
 Balamuthia mandrillaris
 Giardia
 Cyclospora cayetanensis
 Cryptosporidium
 Toxoplasma gondii
 Leishmania - L. tropica, L. donovani, and L. mexicana are known to cause Leishmaniasis.
 Plasmodium - causes the fatal disease, Malaria. P. falciparum, P. vivax, and P. malariae are pathogenic to humans.
 Babesia

Fungi
 Gymnosporangium and other rusts
 Pyrenophora teres
 Cordyceps

Arthropods
 Pentastomida

Ectoparasites
(ecto = outside; parasites that live on but not within their hosts, for example, attached to their skin)

Arthropoda
 Acari
Varroa destructor
 Cymothoa exigua
 Bed bugs
 Culicidae (mosquitoes) 
 Calyptra (moth) (vampire moths)
 Hippoboscoidea
 Tsetse fly
 Lipoptena
 Melophagus ovinus, (sheep keds) and relatives
 Oestridae (bot flies)
 Human botfly
 Cuterebra fontinella (mouse botfly)
 Phlebotominae (sand flies)
 Phthiraptera (Lice)
 Body louse
 Crab louse
 Head louse
 Siphonaptera (fleas)
 Tabanidae (horse flies)
 Tantulocarida
 Triatominae
 Pea crab
 Sacculina

Annelids
 Hirudinea (some leeches)

Monogeneans

Monogeneans are flatworms, generally ectoparasites on fish.
 Calydiscoides euzeti
 Lethacotyle vera
 Protocotyle euzetmaillardi
 Pseudorhabdosynochus spp.

Mollusks
 Cancellaria cooperii
 Glochidium
 Pyramidellidae
 †Platyceratidae

Chordates 
 Cookiecutter shark
 Candiru (vampire fish of Brazil, a facultative parasite)
 Lampreys
 Male Deep sea anglers
 False cleanerfish
 Hood mockingbird
 Oxpeckers (cleaning symbiosis)
 Snubnosed eel
 Vampire bat
 Vampire finch
 Cuckoo (brood parasite)
 Cowbird (brood parasite)

Plants
 Mistletoe 
Monotropa uniflora
 Certain orchids
 Nuytsia
 Santalum album

Fungi
 Corn smut
 Certain mushrooms
Asterotremella albida

References

See also
 List of fictional parasites

Parasitic organisms
Parasitic organisms